Richard Courtney, drama teacher, theatre scholar and international expert in children's drama, was born in Newmarket, England on 4 June 1927 and was educated at Culford School and the University of Leeds.

Between 1948 and 1952 Courtney studied at Leeds with Shakespeare scholar G. Wilson Knight and Pirandello scholar and translator Frederick May. While there, he directed and appeared in several theatre productions and upon graduation continued this endeavor with the Arts Theatre in Leeds and the Rep Theatre in Yorkshire.

On 21 December 1953, he married Rosemary Gale.

From 1956 to 1960, he played various roles on BBC radio. Between 1952 and 1959 he taught drama at schools in England before becoming Senior Lecturer in Drama at Trent Park College of Education in 1959, a position he would retain until 1967. From 1968 to 1971, he was Associate Professor of Theatre at the University of Victoria, British Columbia and was Professor of Drama from 1971 to 1974 at the University of Calgary. While in Calgary, Courtney also directed theatre and served as President of the Canadian Child and Youth Drama Association as well as being an advisor to the Minister of Culture, Andre Fortier.

In 1974, he was appointed Professor of the Ontario Institute for Studies in Education and the University of Toronto Graduate Centre for Drama. At the latter he worked with Peter McLaren, one of the leading architects of critical pedagogy. He maintained these positions until his retirement in 1995. 

In 1975, he traveled to New Mexico to research the dramatic rituals of the Hopi and the Navajo Nations. He visited the University of Melbourne in 1970 and 1974 and was a visiting fellow in the spring of 1979 at the Melbourne State College, Victoria.

Courtney was a drama theorist. He wrote extensively on the subject and has roughly one hundred published works to his name. In addition, he was also responsible for numerous reports and journal articles touching on such subjects as educational drama, drama therapy, arts education, criticism, and the history of drama. Courtney lectured in Australia, Canada, the UK, and the US. He was president of the Canadian Conference of the Arts, 1973-1976 and chairman of the National Inquiry into Arts and Education in Canada, 1975-1979.

Courtney died on Saltspring Island, British Columbia on 16 August 1997.

Selected published works

External links
Richard Courtney archives at the Clara Thomas Archives and Special Collections, York University Libraries, Toronto, Ontario

1927 births
1997 deaths
Canadian educational theorists
People from Newmarket, Suffolk
Academic staff of the University of Toronto
People educated at Culford School
Drama teachers
British emigrants to Canada